Piney, Arkansas may refer to:

 Piney, Franklin County, Arkansas    
 Piney, Garland County, Arkansas   
 Piney, Johnson County, Arkansas   
 Piney, Pope County, Arkansas

See also

 Piney Grove, Lafayette County, Arkansas   
 Piney Grove, Pike County, Arkansas